AS EMT was Estonia's and one of the Baltic's largest mobile operator. Founded on 28 April 1991 as an Estonian under Eesti Telekom (now Telia Eesti).

On 20 January 2016, the company, along with telecommunications provider Elion were merged under the Telia name, along with parent company Eesti Telekom becoming Telia Eesti.

The company is headquartered in Tallinn. Traded on NASDAQ OMX stock exchanges.

AS EMT began operations on April 28, 1991, when a joint venture was formed by Eesti Telekom (51%), Sweden's Telia (24.5%) and Finland's Sonera (24.5%). On September 1, 2014, the company was merged with its parent company Eesti Telekom, which continued to use the EMT brand when offering mobile communication services. On January 20, 2016, Eesti Telekom changed its business name to Telia Eesti AS and merged the existing brands Elion and EMT into one Telia.

External links 
 EMT
 Eesti Telekom
 TeliaSonera

Mobile phone companies of Estonia
Telecommunications companies established in 1991
Estonian companies established in 1991